The fatia (Albanian fatí, definite form: fatía, pl.: fatí/të; English: fate) is an Albanian mythological figure associated with human destiny. Often depicted as three female deities, the essential function of the fatí is to maintain the order of the universe and to enforce its laws.

Along with the mira, they can be found in the folk beliefs of Tosk Albanians. Albanian mythological figures related to fate and destiny can also be found in the folk beliefs of Gheg Albanians with the name of ora and zana.

Appearance
The fatí are visualized as riding on butterflies. On the third day after a child has been born, three Fatits approach the baby's cradle and determine that child's fate. They are also known as Miren, possibly from the Greek Moirai.

See also
 Ora
 Bardha
 Zana e malit

Sources

Citations

Bibliography
 

Albanian legendary creatures